FUB may refer to:
 Adamawa Fulfulde language
 Free University of Berlin, in Germany
 Free University of Bozen-Bolzano, in Bolzano, Italy
 Free University of Brussels, in Brussels, Belgium; now split into:
 Université libre de Bruxelles, a French-speaking university
 Vrije Universiteit Brussel, a Dutch-speaking university